Tyro is an unincorporated community in Nelson County, Virginia, United States.  It was among the communities severely affected by flash flooding from Hurricane Camille in 1969.

It was named from the English word tyro, which also means "beginner" or "novice".

Pharsalia and the Tyro Mill are listed on the National Register of Historic Places.

References
GNIS reference

Unincorporated communities in Nelson County, Virginia
Unincorporated communities in Virginia